Hemming may refer to:

Historic name
 King Hemming (d. 812), King of Denmark
 Hemming Halfdansson (d. 837), Danish Viking
 Hemming (count in Frisia), 9th-century Danish ruler in East Frisia
 Hemming (monk), 11th-century monk and compiler of a cartulary
 Bishop Hemming (1338–1366), bishop of Turku
 Hemming Gadh (c. 1450–1520), Swedish priest
 Hemming Gadd (1837–1915), Swedish Army general

Surname
 Andrew Hemming, English curler and coach
 Arthur Francis Hemming (1893–1964), English entomologist
 Carol Hemming, make-up artist 
 Gary Hemming (1934–1969), American mountaineer
 George Hemming (1868–1930), American baseball pitcher
 Gerry Patrick Hemming (1937–2008), U.S. Marine mercenary and CIA agent
 Ingrid Fuzjko Hemming (born 1934), Swedish pianist
 James Hemming (1909–2007), English child psychologist, educationalist and humanist
 John Hemming (explorer) (born 1935), Canadian explorer and author
 John Hemming (politician) (born 1960), English politician
 Lindy Hemming (born 1948), Welsh costume designer
 Nick Hemming (born 1973), English musician
 Nikki Hemming (born 1967), CEO and part owner of Sharman Networks
 Tyler Hemming (born 1985), Canadian soccer player
 William Hemming (1826–1897), English clergyman and cricketer

Other uses
 Hemming (metalworking), a sheet metal process where the edge is rolled over onto itself
 Hemming (musician), stage name of Candice Martello, American musician
 Hemming (album), 2015 album
 Hemming (sewing)

See also
 Hamming (disambiguation)
 Heming (disambiguation)
 Hemings, a surname
 Hemmings, a surname